Bass is a name shared by many species of fish. The term encompasses both freshwater and marine species, all belonging to the large order Perciformes, or perch-like fishes. The word bass comes from Middle English , meaning 'perch'.

Types

 The black basses, such as the Choctaw bass (Micropterus  haiaka), Guadalupe bass (M. treculii), largemouth bass (M. salmoides), smallmouth bass (M. dolomieu), and spotted bass (M. punctulatus), belong to the sunfish family Centrarchidae.
 The temperate basses, such as the European seabass (Dicentrarchus labrax), striped bass (Morone saxatilis) and white bass (M. chrysops), belong to the family Moronidae.
 The Asian seabasses, such as the Japanese seabass (Lateolabrax japonicus) and Blackfin seabass (L. latus), belong to the family Lateolabracidae.

Other species known as bass

Many species are also known as basses, including:
 The Australian bass, Macquaria novemaculeata, is a member of the temperate perch family Percichthyidae.
 The black sea bass, Centropristis striata, is a member of the sea bass and sea grouper family Serranidae.
 The Chilean sea bass, Dissostichus eleginoides, also known as the Patagonian toothfish, is a member of the cod icefish family Nototheniidae.
 The giant sea bass Stereolepis gigas, also known as the black sea bass, is a member of the wreckfish family Polyprionidae.
 The "lanternbellies" or "temperate ocean-basses", Acropomatidae.
 The "butterfly peacock bass", Cichla ocellaris, is a member of the cichlid family, Cichlidae and a prized game fish along with its relatives in the genus Cichla.

Fishing

Largemouth, smallmouth, and spotted bass are the most popular game fish in North America.

It is also very popular in South Africa. In the country, largemouth bass is often found in lakes, rivers, creeks, and dams.

When fishing, lures (Bass worms) or live bait will work. Lures that mimic baitfish, worms, crayfish, frogs, and mice are all effective.

References

External links

 

Fish common names